Federico Grüben (1899–1978) was an Argentine Olympic shooter. He competed in the 50 m pistol event at the 1948 Summer Olympics.

References

External links
 

1899 births
1978 deaths
Argentine male sport shooters
Olympic shooters of Argentina
Shooters at the 1948 Summer Olympics
Sportspeople from Córdoba, Argentina